The following is a list of Malayalam films released in the year 1988.

Dubbed films

References

 1988
1988
Malayalam
Fil